Pizzale is a comune (municipality) in the Province of Pavia in the Italian region Lombardy, located about 50 km south of Milan and about 20 km southwest of Pavia.

Pizzale borders the following municipalities: Castelletto di Branduzzo, Lungavilla, Pancarana, Voghera.

References

External links
 Official website

Cities and towns in Lombardy